The 2014 season was the Arizona Cardinals' 95th in the National Football League, their 27th in Arizona and their second under head coach Bruce Arians. Following an explosive 9–1 start to the regular season, they finished at 11–5, achieving their highest win total since 1975 when they were still in St. Louis (also their highest total in a 16-game season). The Cardinals clinched their first playoff berth since 2009, and had a chance to become the first team to try to play the Super Bowl on their own home field, University of Phoenix Stadium. However, after season-ending injuries to Carson Palmer and Drew Stanton, they were forced to start third-string quarterback Ryan Lindley in the wild-card round, losing to the Carolina Panthers, 27–16.

Draft

 Note: The Cardinals traded their original first-round selection (No. 20 overall) to the New Orleans Saints in exchange for the Saints' first- (No. 27 overall) and third- (No. 91 overall) round selections.

Staff

Final roster

Preseason

Schedule

Regular season

Schedule

Game summaries

Regular season

Week 1: vs. San Diego Chargers

Week 2: at New York Giants

Week 3: vs. San Francisco 49ers

Week 5: at Denver Broncos

Week 6: vs. Washington Redskins

Week 7: at Oakland Raiders

Week 8: vs. Philadelphia Eagles

Week 9: at Dallas Cowboys

Week 10: vs. St. Louis Rams

Carson Palmer would suffer a season-ending injury on his left-knee. Drew Stanton would take over as quarterback for the rest of the game. Thanks to the efforts of the defense during the fourth quarter, the Cardinals rallied to beat the Rams 31-14.

Week 11: vs. Detroit Lions

Week 12: at Seattle Seahawks

Week 13: at Atlanta Falcons

Week 14: vs. Kansas City Chiefs

Week 15: at St. Louis Rams

Week 16: vs. Seattle Seahawks

Week 17: at San Francisco 49ers

This would snap the 49ers' 4-game losing streak in Levi's Stadium. With the loss, the Cardinals finished their season to 11-5.

Postseason

NFC Wild Card Playoffs: at #4 Carolina Panthers

The Cardinals' offensive performance was historically bad as the team lost to the 7-8-1 Panthers, by a final score of 27-16, and were eliminated from the postseason.  They committed three turnovers (two of them being red zone interceptions), gained only 8 first downs (and only 2 first downs in the second half) and recorded 78 net yards of offense, the fewest yards gained in a playoff game by any team in NFL postseason history.  After a 9-1 start, the Cardinals went 2-5 in their final seven games.

Standings

Division

Conference

References

External links
 

Arizona
Arizona Cardinals seasons
Arizona